Air Marshal Amit Dev, PVSM, AVSM, VSM, ADC is a retired officer of the Indian Air Force. He served as the Air Officer Commanding-in-Chief (AOC-in-C), Western Air Command. He superannuated on 28 February, 2022.

Early life and education 
Amit Dev did his schooling from St. Michael's High School, Patna. He joined National Defence Academy in 1979. He is an alumnus of the Tactics and Air Combat Development Establishment, Defence Services Staff College, College of Air Warfare and National Defence College. He holds MSc and M Phil degree from Madras University with second M Phil from Osmania University.

Career
Amit Dev was commissioned as a fighter pilot in the Indian Air Force on December 29, 1982. He has flying experience of over 2500 hours on a variety of fighter aircraft including MiG-21 and MiG-27. 

With a vast career of 38 years, he has commanded a fighter aircraft squadron, air defense direction centre and an operational fighter base. He has held various post at IAF as Air Headquarter includes Joint Director Tactical Operations, Director Air Staff Inspection, Principal Director Air Staff Inspection, Assistant Chief of Air Staff (Inspection), Director General Air (Operations) and Air Officer-in-Charge Personnel. He also headed the Air Wing of Strategic Forces Command.

He served as Air Officer in Charge of Personnel from 1 November 2019 to 30 September 2020. He served as Air Officer Commanding in Chief of Eastern Air Command from 1 October 2020 to 30 September 2021. 

He superannuated on 28 February, 2022 and succeeded by Air Marshal Sreekumar Prabhakaran.

Honours and decorations 
During his career, Amit Dev was commended by the Chief of Air Staff in 1995 and has been awarded the Vishisht Seva Medal (VSM) in 2010, the Ati Vishisht Seva Medal (AVSM) in 2019 and the Param Vishisht Seva Medal in 2022.

Personal life 
Air Marshal Amit Dev is married to Mrs Seema Dev and they have two sons.

Gallery

References 

Living people
Indian Air Force air marshals
Recipients of the Param Vishisht Seva Medal
Recipients of the Ati Vishisht Seva Medal
Recipients of the Vishisht Seva Medal
Year of birth missing (living people)
National Defence College, India alumni
College of Air Warfare alumni
Defence Services Staff College alumni